The Devil's Wheel is a 1926 Soviet silent crime film directed by Grigori Kozintsev and Leonid Trauberg.

Plot
During a walk in the garden of the People's House, sailor Ivan Shorin meets Valya and, having missed the scheduled time is late for the ship which is departing for a cruise. The next morning he has to go to a distant foreign trek and his slight delay has turned into a desertion. The young people are sheltered by artists who turn out to be ordinary punks. Not wanting to become a thief, Ivan runs away and surrenders himself to the authorities. After the trial of his friends and just punishment, he returns to his former life.

Cast
Pyotr Sobolevsky - Ivan Shorin, sailor from the cruiser "Aurora"
Lyudmila Semyonova - Valka, street girl
Sergei Gerasimov	 - magician "Human-Question-mark", leader of the gang of bandits
Emil Gal - entertainer Coco, friend of the "Question-mark"
Yanina Zhejmo - a girl from the gang
Sergei Martinson- orchestra conductor
Andrei Kostrichkin - one of the inhabitants of the thieves' den
Nikolai Gorodnichev - a punk called as "superintendent"
Antonio Tserep - the owner of the cellar

References

External links

1926 films
Lenfilm films
Soviet black-and-white films
Soviet silent feature films
Films directed by Grigori Kozintsev
Films directed by Leonid Trauberg
Soviet crime films
Russian crime films
1926 crime films
Russian black-and-white films